The VAG Class G1 is an electric multiple unit (EMU) train type operated by the Verkehrs-Aktiengesellschaft Nürnberg on the Nuremberg U-Bahn system. They are replacing the VAG Class DT1 and VAG Class DT2 currently in service on Nuremberg U-Bahn line U1. On 20 August 2020, the first of three G1 trains entered into the revenue service.

Formation 
The G1 trains consist of four permanently-coupled cars, which are connected by gangways, allowing passengers to walk through the whole train.

Interior 
The interior features LED lighting, CCTV security cameras, multi-purpose areas for strollers and wheelchairs, and air conditioning. Free Wi-Fi will be provided in the trains. While planned to only be used on the non-automated U1, the trains are capable of automated operation and the operator cabin is removable should they be used on automated lines in the future or U1 be automated.

History 
The trains were ordered in December 2015 as a replacement for the DT1 trains currently in service on the U-Bahn system. Construction of the trains began in 2017. The first painted car body was presented at the Siemens Vienna plant on 17 April 2018, and the first set was completed in December 2018. The order also includes options for 11 additional sets, six of which would replace the VAG Class DT2 trains. The option for six additional sets as a replacement for the DT2 trains was exercised on 27 November 2018. Another seven additional sets were ordered in March 2019. The first set was delivered to VAG's Langwasser depot on 3 May 2019.

References

External links 

 VAG fleet information 

Nuremberg U-Bahn
Electric multiple units of Germany
750 V DC multiple units
Siemens multiple units